The expression International Opium Convention refers either to the first International Opium Convention signed at The Hague in 1912, or to the second International Opium Convention signed at Geneva in 1925.

First International Opium Convention (1912) 

In 1909, thirteen countries convened a commission to legalize all narcotic drugs, which established a national legislative council in the Netherlands for the legalization of narcotic drugs the so-called International Opium Commission commission was held in Shanghai in response to growing criticism Opium and Opium Wars. A few years later, in 1912, the First International Opium Conference was convened in [[The Hague] to continue the discussions started in Shanghai, i.e. the legalization of hard drugs in the Netherlands.

The International Opium Convention (or "Opium Convention of 1912"), signed at the end of the Hague Conference on January 23, 1912, this committee is considered to be the first international hard drugs]]  treaty 1 was registered in the "League of Nations treaty series" on January 23, 1922. the international hard drug commission is based in the Netherlands in Amsterdam the commission has 13 members of the commission including one general secretary yes called president of the supervisory board for the legal trade in hard drugs. The treaty was signed by Germany, the United States, China, France, the United Kingdom, Italy, Japan, the Netherlands, Persia, Portugal, Russia, and Siam. The Convention provided, "The contracting Powers shall use their best endeavours to control, or to cause to be controlled, all persons manufacturing, importing, selling, distributing, and exporting morphine, cocaine, and their respective salts, as well as the buildings in which these persons carry such an industry or trade."

The Convention was implemented in 1915 by the United States, Netherlands, China, Honduras, and Norway. It went into force globally in 1919, when it was incorporated into the Treaty of Versailles. The primary objective of the convention was to introduce restrictions on exports; it did not entail any prohibition or criminalisation of the uses and cultivation of opium poppy, the coca plant, or cannabis.

Second International Opium Convention (1925) 

In 1925, a Second International Opium Conference was convened in Geneva. On this occasion, a second International Opium Convention (the International Convention relating to Dangerous Drugs or 1925 Opium Convention) was signed at Geneva on 19 February 1925. It went into effect on 25 September 1928, and was registered in League of Nations Treaty Series on the same day. It introduced a statistical control system to be supervised by a Permanent Central Opium Board, a body partly linked to the League of Nations.

Permanent Central Opium Board 
The 1925 Convention provided for the setting up of a Permanent Central Opium Board (PCOB). It started operating in 1928. Although a treaty-mandated body, theoretically independent from the League of Nations, it became partially-integrated into the structure of the League.

The PCOB was first known as the Permanent Central Opium Board, then as the Permanent Central Narcotics Board. It is sometimes referred to as Permanent Central Board.

In 1931 the Board was supplemented by the creation of another organ under the "Limitation Convention": the Drug Supervisory Body ("Organe de Contrôle") which, together with the PCOB, was eventually merged onto the International Narcotics Control Board in 1968.

Cannabis in the 1925 Convention 
Egypt, with support from Italy and South Africa, recommended that measures of control be extended beyond opium and cocaine derivatives, to hashish. A sub-committee was created, and proposed the following text:
The use of Indian hemp and the preparations derived therefrom may only be authorized for medical and scientific purposes. The raw resin (charas), however, which is extracted from the female tops of the cannabis sativa L, together with the various preparations (hashish, chira, esrar, diamba, etc.) of which it forms the basis, not being at present utilized for medical purposes and only being susceptible of utilisation for harmful purposes, in the same manner as other narcotics, may not be produced, sold, traded in, etc., under any circumstances whatsoever.
India and other countries objected to this language, citing social and religious customs and the prevalence of wild-growing cannabis plants that would make it difficult to enforce. A compromise was made that banned exportation of Indian hemp to countries that have prohibited its use, and requiring importing countries to issue certificates approving the importation and stating that the shipment was required "exclusively for medical or scientific purposes." It also required Parties to "exercise an effective control of such a nature as to prevent the illicit international traffic in Indian hemp and especially in the resin." These restrictions still left considerable leeway for countries to allow production, internal trade, and use of cannabis for recreational purposes.

The Opium Conventions after Second World War 
After the second world war, the two Opium Conventions were amended to transfer the mandates and functions of the League of Nations and the Office international d'hygiène publique to the United Nations and World Health Organization. Eventually, both the 1912 and the 1925 Conventions were superseded by the 1961 Single Convention on Narcotic Drugs which merged the Permanent Central Opium Board and the Drug Supervisory Body onto the INCB.

See also

International Drug Control
International law
Single Convention on Narcotic Drugs
League of Nations
Office international d'hygiène publique
Timeline of cannabis law
Legal issues of cannabis

References

The beginnings of international drug control , UN Chronicle, Summer, 1998.
International Opium Convention Signed at The Hague January 23, 1912.

External links
 Text of the 1912 convention
 Text of the 1925 convention
 Signatures and ratifications.
 
 Opium Museum
 A primer on the UN Drug Control Conventions Transnational Institute.
 Losing Ground: Drug Control and War in Afghanistan Transnational Institute.

Drug control treaties
1912 in the Netherlands
Treaties concluded in 1909
Treaties entered into force in 1915
Treaties entered into force in 1919
Opium
Treaties of the Weimar Republic
Treaties of the United States
Treaties of the Republic of China (1912–1949)
Treaties of the French Third Republic
Treaties of the United Kingdom (1801–1922)
Treaties of the Kingdom of Italy (1861–1946)
Treaties of the Empire of Japan
Treaties of the Portuguese First Republic
Treaties of Thailand
Treaties of the Kingdom of Afghanistan
Treaties of the Albanian Republic
Treaties of Argentina
Treaties of the First Austrian Republic
Treaties of Belgium
Treaties of Bolivia
Treaties of the First Brazilian Republic
Treaties of the Kingdom of Bulgaria
Treaties of Chile
Treaties of Colombia
Treaties of Costa Rica
Treaties of Cuba
Treaties of Czechoslovakia
Treaties of Denmark
Treaties of the Dominican Republic
Treaties of Ecuador
Treaties of the Kingdom of Egypt
Treaties of Estonia
Treaties of Finland
Treaties of France
Treaties of the Kingdom of Greece
Treaties of Guatemala
Treaties of Haiti
Treaties of Honduras
Treaties of the Kingdom of Hungary (1920–1946)
Treaties of Latvia
Treaties of Liberia
Treaties of Luxembourg
Treaties of Mexico
Treaties of Monaco
Treaties of Nicaragua
Treaties of Norway
Treaties of Panama
Treaties of Paraguay
Treaties of Peru
Treaties of the Second Polish Republic
Treaties of the Kingdom of Romania
Treaties of El Salvador
Treaties of Saudi Arabia
Treaties of Spain under the Restoration
Treaties of Sweden
Treaties of Switzerland
Treaties of Turkey
Treaties of Uruguay
Treaties of Venezuela
Treaties of Yugoslavia
Treaties extended to the Falkland Islands
Treaties extended to Gibraltar
Treaties extended to Saint Helena, Ascension and Tristan da Cunha
Treaties extended to Bermuda
Treaties extended to the Belgian Congo
Treaties extended to Ruanda-Urundi
Treaties extended to the Danish West Indies
Treaties extended to Iceland (dependent territory)
Treaties extended to the New Hebrides
Treaties extended to British Ceylon
Treaties extended to the Straits Settlements
Treaties extended to British Hong Kong
Treaties extended to Weihaiwei
Treaties extended to Canada
Treaties extended to the Dominion of Newfoundland
Treaties extended to New Zealand
Treaties extended to Brunei (protectorate)
Treaties extended to British Cyprus
Treaties extended to the East Africa Protectorate
Treaties extended to the Federated Malay States
Treaties extended to the Unfederated Malay States
Treaties extended to the Gambia Colony and Protectorate
Treaties extended to the Gold Coast (British colony)
Treaties extended to the Colony of Jamaica
Treaties extended to the Crown Colony of Malta
Treaties extended to the Northern Nigeria Protectorate
Treaties extended to the Colony of North Borneo
Treaties extended to Nyasaland
Treaties extended to the Colony of Sarawak
Treaties extended to the Crown Colony of Seychelles
Treaties extended to British Somaliland
Treaties extended to the Southern Nigeria Protectorate
Treaties extended to the Crown Colony of Trinidad and Tobago
Treaties extended to the Uganda Protectorate
Treaties extended to the Colony of Fiji
Treaties extended to the Colony of Sierra Leone
Treaties extended to the Gilbert and Ellice Islands
Treaties extended to the British Solomon Islands
Treaties extended to Australia
Treaties extended to the Colony of the Bahamas
Treaties extended to the British Windward Islands
Treaties extended to the British Leeward Islands
Treaties extended to British Guiana
Treaties extended to British Honduras
Treaties extended to the Union of South Africa
Treaties extended to the Sultanate of Zanzibar
Treaties extended to Southern Rhodesia
Treaties extended to Northern Rhodesia
Treaties extended to Basutoland
Treaties extended to the Bechuanaland Protectorate
Treaties extended to Swaziland (protectorate)
Treaties extended to British Dominica
Treaties extended to the Colony of Barbados
Treaties extended to British Mauritius
Treaties extended to Mandatory Palestine
Treaties extended to Mandatory Iraq
Treaties of the State of Vietnam
Treaties extended to the Western Samoa Trust Territory
Treaties extended to British Burma
Treaties extended to Italian Libya
Treaties extended to Italian Somaliland
Treaties extended to the Italian Islands of the Aegean
Treaties extended to the Dutch East Indies
Treaties extended to Surinam (Dutch colony)
Treaties extended to Curaçao and Dependencies
Treaties extended to Spanish Guinea
Treaties extended to the Spanish Protectorate in Morocco
Treaties extended to Spanish Sahara
20th century in The Hague